Clarkenia pantherina is a species of moth of the family Tortricidae. It is endemic to Ecuador (Napo Province).

The ground colour of the forewings is whitish cream with a slight yellowish admixture especially along the edges of the spots and in the apical area. The markings are brownish black. The hindwings are white cream, in the apical area tinged with brownish.

References

External links

Moths described in 2009
Endemic fauna of Ecuador
Euliini
Moths of South America
Taxa named by Józef Razowski